Finkenbach may refer to:

 Finkenbach (Laxbach), a river of Hesse and Baden-Württemberg, Germany
 Finkenbach (Bassum), a river of Lower Saxony, Germany
 Finkenbach (Lutter), a river of North Rhine-Westphalia, Germany
 Finkenbach-Gersweiler, a municipality in the Donnersbergkreis district, in Rhineland-Palatinate, Germany
 Finkenbach (Oberzent), a village and part of Oberzent in Hesse, Germany